is a passenger railway station located in Kanagawa-ku, Yokohama, Kanagawa Prefecture, Japan, operated by the private railway company Tokyu Corporation.

Lines

Station layout 
The station consists of two elevated opposed side-platforms, with the station building underneath.

Platforms

History
Higashi-Hakuraku Station was opened on March 10, 1927.

Passenger statistics
In fiscal 2019, the station was used by an average of 15,031 passengers daily. 

The passenger figures for previous years are as shown below.

Surrounding area
Kanagawa Prefectural Kanagawa Technical High School 
 Kanagawa Prefectural Kanagawa Comprehensive High School
Yokohama City Futatsuya Elementary School
Yokohama Nishikanagawa Post Office
Kanagawa Magistrate Court
Kanagawa Ward Prosecutor's Office

See also
 List of railway stations in Japan

References

External links

 

Railway stations in Kanagawa Prefecture
Railway stations in Japan opened in 1927
Tokyu Toyoko Line
Stations of Tokyu Corporation
Railway stations in Yokohama